Phoebe Nyawade Okowa is a Kenyan Lawyer and Professor of Public International Law and Director of Graduate Studies at Queen Mary University of London. In 2021 she was elected to the International Law Commission for a period of five years, becoming the first African woman to serve as a member of the commission. In 2017 she was nominated as an arbiter to the Permanent Court of Arbitration at the Hague. An advocate of the High Court of Kenya, she has acted as counsel and consultant to governments and non-governmental organisations on questions of international law before domestic and international courts including the International Court of Justice.

The International Law Commission (ILC) is a body of experts responsible for helping develop and codify international law.

It is composed of 34 individuals recognized for their expertise and qualifications in international law, who are elected by the United Nations General Assembly (UNGA) every five years.

The government of Kenya nominated Professor Phoebe Okowa for the UN International Law Commission in May 2021.

Early life 
Okowa was born in Kericho on 1 January 1965 to Luo parents. She graduated at the top of her class with a Bachelor of Law (LLB) with First Class Honours from the University of Nairobi, Kenya. She proceeded to Wadham College at the University of Oxford on a Foreign and Commonwealth Office Scholarship, obtaining the degree of Bachelor of Civil Law (BCL). She completed her doctoral thesis (D.Phil) at Oxford under the supervision of the Chichele Professor of International Law (Ian Brownlie QC), Her monograph on State Responsibility for Transboundary Air Pollution published by Oxford University Press remains the definitive work on the legal challenges that environmental harm presents for traditional methods of accountability in International Law.

Academic career 
Okowa taught Public International law, Constitutional Law and Private International Law as a member of the Faculty of Law at the University of Bristol. She has held visiting appointments at the Universities of Lille, Helsinki Stockholm and WZB Berlin Social Science Center for Global Constitutionalism and has lectured for the United Nations at its Regional Course on International Law for Africa. In 2011 and 2015 she was Hauser Global Visiting Professor of Law at New York University, School of Law.

In 2017 she was nominated as an arbiter to the Permanent Court of Arbitration at the Hague.

Previously, she has taught Public international Law, Constitutional Law and Private International Law at the University of Bristol.

Legal career 
Okowa sits on the International Advisory Board of the Stockholm Centre for International Law and the Executive Committee of the International Society of Public Law (ICON-S).

Personal life 
Okowa primarily resides in Cambridge, UK.

References 

Kenyan women lawyers
Legal scholars
International Law Commission officials
People associated with Queen Mary University of London
Alumni of the University of Oxford
University of Nairobi alumni
Living people
1965 births